The IBM 1440 computer was announced by IBM October 11, 1962. This member of the IBM 1400 series was described many years later as "essentially a lower-cost version of the 1401," and programs for the 1440 could easily be adapted to run on the IBM 1401.

Despite what IBM described as "special features ... to meet immediate data processing requirements  and ... to absorb increased demands," the 1440 did not quite attain the same commercial success as the 1401, and it was withdrawn on February 8, 1971.

Author Emerson Pugh wrote that the 1440 "did poorly in the marketplace because it was initially offered without the ability to attach magnetic tape units as well." (referring to offering both tape and disk).

System configuration

The IBM 1441 processing unit (CPU) contained arithmetic and logic circuits and up to 16,000 alphanumeric storage positions.

The console was either a Model 1 or, when an electric typewriter was added, a Model 2, of the IBM 1447 operator's console.

Peripherals
The following peripherals were available:
 IBM 1442 card reader/punch
 Model 1 read up to 300 cards a minute and punched up to 80 columns a second
 Model 2 read up to 400 cards a minute and punched up to 160 columns a second
 Model 4, a read-only unit, read up to 400 cards/minute.
An IBM 1440 could be configured with a choice of:
Model 4 (lowest cost)
Model 4, for reading, and a Model 1 or 2 as a second unit

 IBM 1443 flying typebar printer
 Basic rate of 150 lines a minute and up to 430 lines a minute, depending on typebar
 Interchangeable typebars having character sets of 13, 39, 52, and 63 characters

 IBM 1311 disk drive
 Capacity for 2 million characters in each removable pack
 With optional "Move Track Record" feature, capacity is increased to 2,980,000 characters in each pack
 Each pack weighed less than 10 lb (5 kg).
 Up to five 1311 drives
 Tape drives
 The IBM 7335 tape drive, available for use with the 1440, was introduced by IBM on October 10, 1963.

Software

IBM 1440 Autocoder was the assembly language provided by IBM. An IOCS was also provided, as was a collection of "Disk File Organization Routines".

Pricing
The cost and rental rate were:
 Purchase price: $90,000 and up, depending on system configuration.
 Rental rate: $1,500 and up, monthly rental, depending on system configuration.

Installations
Notable installations included a high-end 1440 at the Chicago Police Department installed by reformist superintendent Orlando Winfield Wilson in the early 1960s.

In the 1960s, Polish ZOWAR (ZETO Warszawa) was officially the first customer for IBM in Poland after WWII, despite the Iron Curtain.

In 2012, the TechWorks! Prototype Workshop of the  Center for Technology & Innovation (CT&I) in Binghamton, New York successfully resurrected a 1440 system including a CPU and console, a 1311 disk drive, and a 1442 card reader/punch.

An example of a more fully configured 1440 was:
 five disk drives
 two magnetic tape drives
 two card reader-punches
 one high-speed printer
 an optical reader (to transfer specially coded medical data forms to magnetic tape)

See also
 IBM 1400 series

References

External links
 IBM Archive: 1440 Data Processing System
 IBM 1440 Data Processing System marketing brochure
 Original vintage film from 1962 Computer History Archives Project 
 Center for Technology & Innovation – IBM 1440 Project
 1440 documents on bitsavers.org

1440
Variable word length computers
Decimal computers